Timau can refer to:
Timau, in Meru, Kenya
 Timau, the Friulian name for Timavo